Kashmakash (literal English translation: "dilemma") is the first compilation album and third overall album of the Pakistani rock band, Junoon. It is said to be the first compilation album by a pop band in Pakistan. Junoon was taken to court for the controversy generated by the video for "Ehtesaab", which included footage of a polo pony eating in a posh restaurant. Many thought the image was an indictment of the corrupt Pakistani political elite, and especially of former Prime Minister Benazir Bhutto. The government quickly banned the song and video from state television.

Track listing
All music written & composed by Salman Ahmad and Sabir Zafar.

Personnel
All information is taken from the CD.

Junoon
Salman Ahmad - vocals, lead guitar
Ali Azmat - vocals, backing vocals
Brian O'Connell - bass guitar, backing vocals

Additional musicians
Female vocals on "Jogia" by Fifi Haroon
Backing vocals on "Ehtesaab" by Najam Sheraz

Production
Produced by Brian O'Connell & Salman Ahmad

References

External links
 Junoon's Official Website

Junoon (band) compilation albums
1995 compilation albums
Urdu-language albums